Ryde or Die Vol. 1 is a compilation album from American hip-hop record label Ruff Ryders Entertainment, released on April 27, 1999. The album debuted at #1, selling roughly 285,000 copies in its first week and was certified platinum on June 2, 1999.

Track listing

Chart positions

Weekly charts

Year-end charts

See also
 List of number-one albums of 1999 (U.S.)
 List of number-one R&B albums of 1999 (U.S.)

References

1999 compilation albums
Interscope Records compilation albums
Albums produced by Swizz Beatz
Record label compilation albums
Ruff Ryders Entertainment compilation albums
Hip hop compilation albums